Rgangkum may refer to:

Rgangkum, Chipw, Kachin State, Burma
Rgangkum, Hsawlaw, Kachin State, Burma